Shagun Sharma is an Indian actress who works in Hindi television. She is best known for her portrayal of Sonali Malhotra Rathore in Ishk Par Zor Nahi, Tanya Awasthi Kashyap in Sasural Genda Phool 2 and Mohini Vijayan Chaudhary in Harphoul Mohini.

Early life
Sharma was born on 28 October in a Hindu family in Shimla, Himachal Pradesh, India

Career
Sharma started her career in 2015 playing Sanjana Kapoor in the Star Plus show Kuch Toh Hai Tere Mere Darmiyaan. After that she was seen playing parallel lead and supporting roles in several Hindi series.

In March 2021, She next played the role of Sonu in Sony TV show Ishk Par Zor Nahi. In December 2021, She made a breakthrough in her career with the lead role of Titli in Star Bharat show Sasural Genda Phool 2. 

In June 2022, Sharma was seen as the lead Mohini Vijayan opposite Zebby Singh in Harphoul Mohini. In September 2022, Sharma starred alongside Adnan Khan and Rakesh Bedi in a short film Mera Number Kab Aayega which was officially selected and premiered at various film festivals winning over 25 awards.

Filmography

Television

Films

Web series

Music videos

See also 
 List of Hindi television actresses
 List of Indian television actresses

References

External links

Year of birth missing (living people)
Living people
Indian television actresses
21st-century Indian actresses